Martonvásár is a district in eastern part of Fejér County. Martonvásár is also the name of the town where the district seat is found. The district is located in the Central Transdanubia Statistical Region.

Geography 
Martonvásár District borders with Bicske District to the north, Érd District and Ráckeve District (Pest County) to the east, Dunaújváros District to the south, Gárdony District to the west. The number of the inhabited places in Martonvásár District is 8.

Municipalities 
The district has 2 towns and 6 villages.
(ordered by population, as of 1 January 2012)

The bolded municipalities are cities.

See also
List of cities and towns in Hungary

References

External links
 Postal codes of the Martonvásár District

Districts in Fejér County